Submersible is a 2020 Ecuadorian thriller drama film directed by Alfredo León León. It was selected as the Ecuadorian entry for the Best International Feature Film at the 94th Academy Awards.

Plot
With their narco-submarine on the verge of sinking, three crew members discover a young girl bound and gagged in a cargo hold.

Cast
 Natalia Reyes
 Leynar Gómez

See also
 List of submissions to the 94th Academy Awards for Best International Feature Film
 List of Ecuadorian submissions for the Academy Award for Best International Feature Film

References

External links
 

2020 films
2020 thriller drama films
Ecuadorian drama films
2020s Spanish-language films